West Arm may refer to:

 West Arm, Northern Territory, Australia
West Arm, Ontario, Canada
West Arm Provincial Park, British Columbia, Canada